The Sign of the Beaver is a children's historical novel by American author Elizabeth George Speare, which has won numerous literary awards. It was published in February 1983, and has become one of her most famous works.

The idea for this book came from a factual story that Elizabeth George Speare discovered in Milo, Maine about a young boy who was left alone for a summer in the wilderness and was befriended by a Native American, named Attean, and his grandfather. The novel has been adapted into a television film titled Keeping the Promise.

Plot
The Sign of the Beaver tells the story of 13-year-old Matthew James "Matt" Hallowell, an 18th-century American settler. He and his father build a log cabin in the wilderness of Maine, then Matt is left alone to guard the cabin and his family's claim to the land while his father heads back to Quincy, Massachusetts to pick up his mother, his sister, and the new baby and bring them back to the cabin. Matt learns how to survive and deal with difficult situations, getting help from Attean, a Native American boy, and his family. When Matt fears his father will not return, Attean asks him to join the Beaver tribe and move north.

Awards

1983 Josette Frank Award (won as prize)
1984 Christopher Award (won as prize)
1984 A Booklist Editors' Choice (won)
1984 Horn Book Fanfare (won)
1984 Scott O'Dell Award for Historical Fiction (won as prize)
1984 An American Library Association Notable Children's Book citation
1984 An American Library Association Best Books for Young Adults citation
1983–1984 Young Hoosier Book Award (nominee) 
1989 The New York Times Best Book of the Year

References

1983 American novels
 American children's novels
 American historical novels
 Children's historical novels
 Newbery Honor-winning works
 American novels adapted into films
 Novels set in Maine
Fiction set in 1768
 Novels set in the 1760s
 Houghton Mifflin books
1983 children's books
 Native Americans in popular culture
 Books about Native Americans